Ichinosaka Dam is a gravity dam located in Yamaguchi prefecture in Japan. The dam is used for flood control. The catchment area of the dam is 6.7 km2. The dam impounds about 14  ha of land when full and can store 1485 thousand cubic meters of water. The construction of the dam was started on 1971 and completed in 1983.

References

Dams in Yamaguchi Prefecture
1983 establishments in Japan